David Marjoribanks Gaskin (born 1945), is a male former athlete who competed for England.

Athletics career
Gaskin was selected by England to represent his country in decathlon and long jump events. He was a two times National championship runner-up in decathlon.

He represented England in the decathlon, at the 1966 British Empire and Commonwealth Games in Kingston, Jamaica.

References

1945 births
English male long jumpers
Athletes (track and field) at the 1966 British Empire and Commonwealth Games
Living people
English decathletes
Commonwealth Games competitors for England